Vasilevski is a surname. Notable people with the surname include:

Alexander Vasilevski (born 1975), Ukrainian ice hockey player
Alexei Vasilevski (born 1980), Russian figure skater
Andrei Vasilevski (ice hockey b. 1966), Russian ice hockey goaltender
Andrei Vasilevski (ice hockey b. 1994), Russian ice hockey goaltender
Andrei Vasilevski (tennis), Belarusian tennis player
Daniel Vasilevski (born 1981), Australian soccer player

See also
Vasilevsky (disambiguation)